The Lake Afdera killifish (Aphanius stiassnyae) is a fish belonging to the family Cyprinodontidae. It is found in Lake Afdera in Ethiopia. The species was evaluated by the IUCN on 1 May 2009 and listed as endangered on the Red List.

Etymology 
The species name, stiassnyae, is named after Melanie L.J. Stiassny, who studied African fish.

Description 
The Lake Afdera killifish reaches a maximum length of 7.7 cm. It has a sharply upturned lower jaw; it is also one of two species in its genus to possess conical teeth.

References 

Fauna of Ethiopia